The Men's team sprint event of the 2009 UCI Track Cycling World Championships was held on 25 March 2009.

Qualifying

Finals

References

Men's team sprint
UCI Track Cycling World Championships – Men's team sprint